The 2006 Hard Justice was a professional wrestling pay-per-view (PPV) event produced by Total Nonstop Action Wrestling (TNA), which took place on August 13, 2006 at the Impact Zone in Orlando, Florida. It was the second event under the Hard Justice chronology. Nine matches were scheduled on the event's card, but because of a pyrotechnical malfunction, one was cancelled due to time constraints.

In October 2017, with the launch of the Global Wrestling Network, the event became available to stream on demand.

Storylines
Hard Justice featured ten professional wrestling matches and two pre-show matches that involved different wrestlers from pre-existing scripted feuds and storylines. Wrestlers portrayed villains, heroes, or less distinguishable characters in the scripted events that built tension and culminated in a wrestling match or series of matches.

Results

References

2006 in professional wrestling in Florida
Events in Orlando, Florida
Professional wrestling in Orlando, Florida
August 2006 events in the United States
Hardcore Justice
2006 Total Nonstop Action Wrestling pay-per-view events